Larry Keel (born November 25, 1968) is an American bluegrass musician from Southwest Virginia who has been performing since 1976. He was a founding member of Magraw Gap in 1990. He also performs with his wife, bassist Jenny Keel, in The Larry Keel Experience. He has released over a dozen albums.

Early life 
Larry Keel was born in Manassas, Virginia in 1968. He was taught guitar by his father James Keel, who played banjo. His brother Gary, who played guitar — and was twelve years older – bought him one when he was seven. He began playing seriously in 1975. Between 1976 and 1985 he performed bluegrass music in a number of "semi-professional situations", e.g., bluegrass and fiddler conventions, community events, barbecues, etc.

In 1986 was hired by Disney as a contract musician to perform at Tokyo Disneyland when he was 18. Returning to the United States, he met bluegrass musicians John Flower and Mark Vann in Fauquier County, Virginia in 1989 and together they began exploring "progressive string music" in a band they formed named Farmer's Trust. In 1990, Mark Vann (1963–2002) moved to Telluride, Colorado to help found the "Cajun-influenced jam band" Leftover Salmon.

Career
In 1990, Keel and his long-time friend Will Lee – son of guitarist Ricky Lee from Ralph Stanley's band in the 1970s – founded a "progressive string band" named Magraw Gap. Through 1993 the group traveled throughout the Shenandoah Valley competing in bluegrass competitions. In 1993, Keel entered the guitar competition at Telluride Bluegrass Festival and won first place. In 1994, Magraw Gap began touring regularly. Keel won the guitar competition again in 1996.

Keel met Jennifer Newmark when she came to see Gary Ruley play in March 1994. When Keel got up on stage with Gary to pick a tune," she was "blown away" by his musicianship, particularly by their take on the David Grisman tune "Eat My Dust". Although Jenny played piano by ear and sang, had never played a stringed instrument before she met Keel. She got together with Keel, and quickly began learning the bass.

In September 1996, Keel split with Magraw Gap and formed the Larry Keel Experience, made up of himself on guitar, Jenny on bass, and other musicians he'd worked with over the years. Over the next several years the group recorded a number of albums.

In January 2005, Keel created a new band, Larry Keel & Natural Bridge — consisting of himself on guitar, Jenny on bass, Mark Schimick on mandolin, and Will Lee on banjo. They have toured and recorded extensively.

Recordings 
Starting in 1996, when Keller Williams recorded Buzz with Magraw Gap as supporting musicians – and the group released their self-titled CD – Keel has been active recordings. The Larry Keel Experience's 1997 CD Miles & Miles featured 20 special guests. In 1998, Keel worked with Curtis Burch, recent Grammy Award-winner for The Great Dobro Sessions.

Larry Keel Experience released Larry Keel, Curtis Burch & the Experience with Billy Constable in 2002. Keel's 2004 Journey CD, recorded at his home in Natural Bridge, included guest artists David VanDeventer, Danny Knicely, Will Lee, Gary Ruley, John Flower, Robert Mabe, Slinky Cobblestone, and Morgan Morrison. In 2009, Larry Keel and Natural Bridge released an almost entirely original Backwoods, co-produced by Keller Williams and mastered by Bill Wolf. The Wounded Messenger noted, "Perhaps no song better encapsulates the group's sound than the constantly shifting "Crocodile Man", which meanders through steep, jazzy terrain often explored by progressive acoustic acts but perfected here."

Larry and Jenny Keel's second album with Keller Williams, performing as Keller and the Keels, Thief went No. 1 on Billboard Charts and stayed there for several weeks in a row.

Touring 

Larry Keel tours actively with one of his many musical act combos, and with other musical acts – making appearances at major festivals across the US. In 2002, Larry Keel Experience played numerous shows with Vassar Clements and Tony Rice, including at Suwannee Springfest and MerleFest. In 2008, Larry Keel and Natural Bridge toured and collaborated with Rice, Yonder Mountain String Band, Fred Tackett, Paul Barerre, Keller Williams, Hot Tuna, and Davisson Brothers Band. In the winter of 2009, Keel joined Adam Aijala of Yonder Mountain String Band on a tour of Washington, Oregon, and Northern California.

Keller and the Keels performed on Jam Cruise 10 in the Caribbean in 2012. Larry Keel and Natural Bridge performed on Steep Canyon Rangers' "Mountain Song at Sea" cruise in the Bahamas in 2013. Larry and Jenny Keel collaborated with Jeff Austin of Yonder Mountain String Band and Danny Barnes on tours throughout the US, including two appearances on the Mumford & Sons "Gentlemen of the Road" tour in Ohio and Oklahoma in 2013.

In 2013, Larry and Jenny Keel appeared as the opening act at The String Cheese Incident's "Hulaween" festival in Live Oak, Florida. In 2014, The Keels appeared at the Lockn' Festival with New Grass Revival founder, Sam Bush. That same year, the Larry Keel Experience played a sold-out show at the "Bluegrass Underground" concert series in a cave in 33 feet below McMinnville, Tennessee.

Larry Keel Experience hosted a 2014 New Year's Eve show at the Oskar Blues Brewery in Brevard, North Carolina. Major acts involved in the show included the Jon Stickley Trio, Jeremy Garrett and Travis Book of the Infamous Stringdusters, Steve McMurry of Acoustic Syndicate, and Mike Guggino of Steep Canyon Rangers.

In July 2015, Keller and the Keels toured through the Deep South with Dangermuffin. Keel also performed in collaboration with Darol Anger, Sam Grisman, and Scott Law that year, adding three sets at FloydFest in Virginia.

Discography 

 Magraw Gap (1996) — with Will Lee on banjo, Danny Knicely on mandolin, Larry Keel on guitar, and Dr. John Flower on bass. [Magraw Gap]
 Miles and Miles (1997) — features some 20 guest musicians performing originals (e.g., Old Man Kelsey, Miles and Miles) and covers ranging from Fats Waller's "Honeysuckle Rose" to Blind Willie Johnson's "God Moves on Water". Recorded in a two-day session at Keel's home in Natural Bridge, Virginia. [Larry Keel Experience]
 The Sound (1998) — features 11 out of 12 original songs, e.g., "Pioneers" and "Jerry's Farewell". Recorded live in the Keel home. Both instrumental and vocal accompaniment pieces are on the album. [Larry Keel Experience]
 Larry Keel Experience (2000) — recorded with superior engineering skill by Mike Brantley, former bass player for The Del McCoury Band. Features original acoustic music by Larry Keel, Will Lee, David Via, and Dr. John Flower – as well as earlier works penned by pioneers of progressive bluegrass music John Hartford, Ben Eldridge, and The Dillards. [Larry Keel Experience]
 Larry Keel, Curtis Burch, and The Experience (2002) — features two-time Grammy Award winner Curtis Burch, an original member of New Grass Revival, whose awards came from his appearing on The Great Dobro Sessions and the soundtrack to the movie Oh Brother, Where Art Thou?
 Journey (2004) — fully self-produced, 14-song album interspersed with familiar, traditional themes and "some startling new territories". [Larry Keel]
 The Keel Brothers, Vol. 1 (2005) — studio recording that with older brother Gary (senior by 12 years) captures a major aspect of Larry Keel's "formation as a master flatpicking guitarist and a preserver of Appalachian and classic American Country music." Draws on selections from the earliest Stanley Brothers, Hank Williams, Doc Watson, The Country Gentlemen, and fiddle and flatpicking tunes that were always part of Keel family jam sessions. [The Keel Brothers]
 Larry Keel & Natural Bridge (2005) — pays respects to forefathers of mountain music who "set the standard of how it should be played and sung." Features Larry Keel on guitar and vocals, Mark Schimick on mandolin and vocals, Andy Thorn on banjo, and Jenny Keel on bass and vocals. [Larry Keel & Natural Bridge]
 Grass (2006) — self-released album containing a "delightfully bizarre collection of anything-but-traditional bluegrass songs." Featuring ten songs, "originals and unexpected cover tunes, that yield to a pure love of music." [Keller and The Keels]
 Keel Brothers, Vol. 2 (2006) — emphasizes roots of Appalachian and Classic country. Includes titles from influential artists such as: Ralph Stanley, Tom T. Hall, Bill Monroe, and Leroy Drumm; with traditional numbers like "Liberty", "Remington Ride", "Cripple Creek", and "Kingdom Cometh". [The Keel Brothers]
 Backwoods (2009) — second studio project from Larry Keel and Natural Bridge. Features seven original compositions of the ten total tunes. Co-produced by Keller Williams. [Larry Keel & Natural Bridge]
 Thief (2010) — Keller Williams gives the bluegrass treatment to 13 rock, pop, and folk songs, from Ryan Adams and Amy Winehouse to Presidents of the United States of America and Butthole Surfers. [Keller & The Keels]
 Classic (2012) — nine out of the 12 compositions written by Keel, bandmates, and songwriting friends. [Larry Keel & Natural Bridge]
 Experienced (2016) — entirely original showcases of Keel's and bandmate Will Lee's songwriting, singing, and instrumentals. With Jenny Keel on upright bass and harmony vocals. Recorded at Wally Cleaver Studio in Fredericksburg, Virginia with Jeff Covert (engineer and guest drummer). Mastered by Bill Wolf (Willie Nelson, Tony Rice, Doc Watson) in Arlington, Virginia. Guest-musician-friends who appear on various tracks include: Sam Bush, Del McCoury, Peter Rowan, Keller Williams, Jason Carter (The Del McCoury Band), Mike Guggino (Steep Canyon Rangers), and Anders Beck (Greensky Bluegrass). [Larry Keel Experience]
 One (2019) —  Keel's turbo-charged acoustic power trio delivers a beautiful and fearless album capturing 7 of his original songs. Larry Keel guitar/lead vocals. With Jenny Keel on bass/harmonies, and Jared Pool on mandolin/vocals. Recorded in real time with no studio tricks or overdubs. Mastered by Bill Wolf (Willie Nelson, Tony Rice, Doc Watson) in Arlington, Virginia. [Larry Keel Experience]
 Speed (2019) — Keller Williams and The Keels. Features a mix of covers and originals. Some of the covers on the album include "Criminal" by Fiona Apple, "Slow Burn" by Kacey Musgraves and "Island In The Sun" by Weezer. Recorded at Wally Cleaver Studio in Fredericksburg, Virginia with Jeff Covert. [Keller and The Keels]

Musical style 
In 2013, NPR noted, "Keel leads a band dedicated to taking fiery, authentic bluegrass around the world." Brian Paul Swank from Bluegrass Today said in 2016, "Larry is a unique artist in that he never settled as just being a guitar wizard, as so many young virtuosos do, but instead, he created his musical identity through his own personal vision".

Honors, awards, distinctions 
 1990–1993 Magraw Gap placed first at a number of bluegrass festivals.
 Keel won the flatpicking guitar competition at Telluride Bluegrass Festival in 1993 and 1996.
 Magraw Gap placed first at Telluride Bluegrass Festival in 1995.
 Flatpicking Guitar Magazine released their "Best of 2001" CD including Larry Keel's original instrumental, "Jerry's Farewell".
 Flatpicking Guitar Magazine released their "Doc Fest" CD in April 2002, a tribute to guitar legend Doc Watson, including a Larry Keel duet with cellist Rushad Eggleston, "Matty Groves".
 In 2004 Keel and wife Jenny were the subject of a video entitled Larry Keel: Beautiful Thing documents a year in their touring life (2002).
 Keel appeared on the cover of Flatpicking Guitar Magazine May/June 2004 issue (with a 5-page feature article).
 Film director Ryan Gielan was invited to show his full-length film Larry Keel: Beautiful Thing as a featured performance at the 2004 MerleFest, the first time the memorial festival had ever before used film as a performance medium.
 In 2009, Keel debuted in his first acting role in independent film, John Lee: The Man They Could Not Hang, playing a jail warden in late 19th century England. His music was also featured on the soundtrack.
 In 2011, Will Lee's tune "Sound Check", performed by Larry Keel Experience, was featured on Confluence Films movie Connect.
 In 2013, Keel's tune "Fishin' Reel" was featured as soundtrack to the Alaskan pike-fishing segment in Confluence Films movie Waypoints.

Personal 
Keel is married to his bassist, Jennifer "Jenny" (née Newmark) Keel. He has a passion for fishing and has developed a number of related enterprises, including a website dedicated to sport fishing and bluegrass called Fishinandpickin.com and retreat workshops that combine these two interests.

References

External links 
 Official Website
 Free Larry Keel music

Musical groups established in 1996
American country music groups
American folk musical groups
American bluegrass music groups
Musical groups from Virginia
1968 births
People from Manassas, Virginia
American bluegrass guitarists
People from Lexington, Virginia
Living people
20th-century American guitarists
American bandleaders
Bluegrass musicians from Virginia